My Brother Jonathan  is a British television drama series which first aired on BBC 2 in five episodes between 12 August and 9 September 1985. It is based on the 1928 novel of the same name by Francis Brett Young, which had previously been made into a 1948 film My Brother Jonathan. Jonathan Dakers is an idealistic young doctor in a coal-mining area of Northern England around the time of the First World War.

Cast
 Daniel Day-Lewis as Jonathan Dakers (5 episodes)
 Benedict Taylor as Harold Dakers (5 episodes)
 Helen Ryan as Lavinia Dakers (5 episodes)
 Caroline Bliss as Edie Martyn (5 episodes)
 Barbara Kellerman as Rachel Hammond (4 episodes)
 Michael Troughton as Arthur Martock (4 episodes)
 John Stone as Dr. Craig (4 episodes)
 Tony Doyle as John Morse (4 episodes)
 Frederick Treves as Dr. Hammond (3 episodes)
 Sally Watkins as Lily Rudge (3 episodes)
 T.P. McKenna as Lloyd Moore (2 episodes)
 Michael Loughnan as  Dr. Monaghan (2 episodes)
 James Cossins as  Reverend Perry (2 episodes)
 Raymond Witch as  Joseph (2 episodes)
 Mark Kingston as  Eugene Dakers (1 episode)
 John Channel-Milis as  Police sergeant (1 episode)
 Barbara Darnley as  Honor Martyn (1 episode)
 Kate Dunn as  Ellen Greenly (1 episode)
 Julian Gartside as  Alec Martyn (1 episode)
 Michael Godley as Major (1 episode)
 James Greene as Mr. Wheeler (1 episode)
 Patrick Jordan as  Mr. Martyn (1 episode)
 Ken Kitson as  Kisha Hodgkiss (1 episode)
 Jeni Ktori as  Sister (1 episode)
 Muriel Lawford as  Old woman (1 episode)
 George Little as  George Higgins (1 episode)
 Robin MacIntyre as  Lily's father (1 episode) 
 Celia Montague as  Sheila Martyn (1 episode)
 Judy Norman as Mrs. Lumley (1 episode)
 Ann Payot as Miss. Jessel (1 episode)
 Margaret Pilleau as  Nursing sister (1 episode)
 Reg Rogers as Station official (1 episode)
 Anthony Roye as Mr. Wilburn (1 episode)
 Catherine Schell as Mrs. Martyn (1 episode)
 Ken Sharrock as  Joe Matthews (1 episode)
 Bill Stewart as Mr. Grise (1 episode)
 Kevin Stoney as  Registrar (1 episode)
 John Taylor as Guard (1 episode)
 Bill Ward as Sgt. Brook (1 episode)

References

Bibliography
Ellen Baskin. Serials on British Television, 1950-1994. Scolar Press, 1996.

External links
 

BBC television dramas
1985 British television series debuts
1985 British television series endings
English-language television shows
Television shows based on British novels